Panglin Plaza is a 57-floor 240 metre (787 foot) tall skyscraper completed in 1999 located in Shenzhen, China. It served as The Hilton until April 2006, since then it is The PangLin Hotel.

See also
 List of tallest buildings in the world

External links
Emporis.com – Panglin Plaza
SkycraperPage.com – Panglin Plaza
Panglin Hotel Shenzhen

Hotel buildings completed in 1999
Skyscraper office buildings in Shenzhen
Skyscraper hotels in Shenzhen
1999 establishments in China